Vasai Creek Bridge is located between Western Railway's Bhayandar and Naigaon railway stations. This rail bridge starts from Bhayandar in Salsette Island, passes through Panju Island and ends at Naigaon in Vasai-Virar Palghar. 

There are two rail bridges that connect Bhayandar with Naigaon i.e. one rail bridge in the West side with 2 tracks & the other rail bridge in the East side with two tracks. 

Since this rail bridge is situated over the Vasai Creek, this bridge is called Vasai Creek Bridge.

Bridge Info:-

References

Railway bridges in India
Bridges in Maharashtra
Transport in Vasai-Virar
Proposed bridges in India
Transport in Mira-Bhayandar
Proposed infrastructure in Maharashtra